The 1991 Western Athletic Conference women's basketball tournament was held March 8–9 at the Arena-Auditorium at the University of Wyoming in Laramie, Wyoming. It was the first ever WAC women's basketball tournament. Utah beat Creighton 86–69 to win the automatic bid to the 1991 NCAA Division I women's basketball tournament.

Format
The tournament field comprised four teams. The most attended of the four games was the Creighton semi-final game, with 662, while the final had 278 attend and the Utah semi-final have 621. Kieishsha Garnes scored 44 points (on 17-of-28 shooting) for San Diego State against Creighton, a tournament record that still stands as of 2020.

Bracket

All-Tournament Team
 Melanee Brooks-McQueen, Utah
 Kieishsha Garnes, San Diego State
 Kathy Halligan, Creighton
 Mikki Kane, Utah (MVP)
 Shannon Struby, Creighton

References

WAC women's basketball tournament
1990–91 Western Athletic Conference women's basketball season
1991 in sports in Wyoming
Sports competitions in Wyoming
Basketball in Wyoming